Jerry's Nugget Casino is a casino in North Las Vegas, Nevada, privately owned and operated by the Stamis family, with  of gaming space.

History 
Jerry's Nugget was founded in 1964 by Jerry Lodge and Jerry Stamis and was originally the site of the Town House Bar. In 1968, Lodge and Stamis bought the Bonanza Club, located across the street from Jerry's Nugget.

In 1995, Jerry's Nugget received an $18 million renovation that expanded the casino size and increased the number of slot machines from 600 to 770. The bingo parlor was also increased, and a poker room was built as well. The 95-seat Royal Street Theatre was also built. By 1998, the poker room had closed.

In 2008, the Nevada Gaming Control Board reinstated the gaming license for executive owner Angelo Stamis. He was the first person approved by the board to have a gaming license restored. The bingo hall was refurbished in 2012.

Lender U.S. Bank filed a lawsuit in March 2012 asking for a receiver to be installed after Jerry's Nugget defaulted on payments on a $3.6 million loan. After months of talks failed to produce an agreement, the casino filed for Chapter 11 bankruptcy protection in August. In September 2013, the casino received a loan that allowed it to win approval for its Chapter 11 reorganization plan.

Jerry's Nugget Casino emerged from Chapter 11 Bankruptcy protection in March 2014. Third generation operators, Jeremy and Joseph Stamis acquired the company and continue to operate it. The company celebrated its 50th anniversary in 2014.

See also
Jerry's Nugget playing cards

Sources 

Casinos in the Las Vegas Valley
1964 establishments in Nevada